Zehista is a village in the municipality of Pirna in the Sächsische Schweiz-Osterzgebirge district of Saxony, Germany. It was incorporated into Pirna in 1930. The place was mentioned for the first time in 1355. It lies in the valley of the river Seidewitz, 2.5 km southwest of Pirna town centre.

References

Pirna
1350s establishments in the Holy Roman Empire
1355 establishments in Europe
Populated places established in the 1350s